Mantophasma kudubergense is a species of insect in the family Mantophasmatidae. It is endemic to Namibia.

Its type locality is the Erongo Mountains of Namibia.

References

Mantophasmatidae
Insects of Namibia
Endemic fauna of Namibia
Insects described in 2006